Jangloos is an Urdu novel written by author Shaukat Siddiqui.

Plot summary
The novel tells the story of two prisoners, Lali and Raheem Dad, who escape from jail. The story is set against the backdrop of central Punjab, Pakistan.

Adaptations
The novel was dramatized by PTV in 1989 and was quite popular. However, the drama was not shot until the end of the story and was left unfinished. The novel is published in three volumes, of which only the first volume has been dramatized. Total episodes are 18. The play was directed by Kazim Pasha.

The casts include:
 M. Warsi as Lali 
 Shabbir Jan as Raheem Dad
 Asharf Khan as ASI Muhammad Khan
 Fareed Nawaz Baloch as Malik Allah Dad
 Kunwar Momin Khan Momin as Waliya (kisaan)
 Samar Tufail as Shaadan
 ... as Taaji
 ... as Ballah (Taaji's & Shaadan's husband)
 ... as Phajja (thief)
 ... as tailor master
 Fareed Nawaz Baloch as Malik Allah Dad, zameendar
 ... Chaudary Anwer (rassa gheer)
 Salim Nasir as Mian Hyaat Muhammad Khan
 Zahoor Ahmad as Mian Riaz Muhammad Khan (Mian Jee) (forcibly imprisoned by Mian Hyaat Muhammad Khan)
 Aslam Laatar as Deywar (the mute servant of Mian Hyaat Muhammad Khan)
 ... as Boota (servant of Mian Hyaat Muhammad Khan)
 Shagufta Ejaz as Jamila
 Zaheen Tahira
 Subhani ba Yunus as Faiz Muhammad master jee
 Saloomi Aziz as Tahira (daughter of master jee)
 M Yousuf
 Ashraf Khan
 Tahira Wasti 
 A. R. Baloch   
 ... as Hamdani, the deputy commissioner
 ... as Nazeer Baig, the secretary to the deputy commissioner
 ... as Noor Muhammad Khokher, zameendar
 ... as Allah Ditta, forcible slave
 ... as Sardaaran, the wife of Allah Ditta
 ... as sunyara, money lender
 ... as Karamat, buffalo thief
 ... as Meraan
 ... as Jhoora, Meraan's boy-friend
 ... as weed-plucker hakeem who died in sudden heart attack
 ... as doctor who treated Lali 
 Shahzad Raza as Chaudery Noor Illahi who, during his migration from India, lost his family and his son was killed by a mob in India.
 ... as woman servant of Chaudery Noor Illahi
 ... as Maulvi Fazal Ahmad, Imaam Masjad
 ... as Rajwa hajaam (nayee)

Pakistani novels
Novels by Shaukat Siddiqui
Novels adapted into television shows
Novels set in Pakistan
Urdu-language novels